Jönköping is a city in southern Sweden with 112,766 inhabitants (2022). Jönköping is situated on the southern shore of Sweden's second largest lake, Vättern, in the province of Småland.

The city is the seat of Jönköping Municipality, which has a population of 144,699 (2022) and is Småland's most populous municipality. Jönköping is also the seat of Jönköping County which has a population of 367,064 (2022). Jönköping is the seat of a district court and a court of appeal as well as the Swedish National Courts Administration. It is the seat of the Swedish Board of Agriculture.

County government
The Jönköping municipality has its headquarters in a place called "rådhuset". Rådhuset is an important component of the function of the municipality as it works as a state office for different departments of and in jönköping. Rådhuset is dependent on the municipality but is its own entity, the head of the rådhuset has political power but is not the head of the jönköping state. The head of the Jönköping state is called the "kommunfullmäktige" which has all the municipal power but sometimes doesn't make the decisions; these are handed down to other departments or the "kommunstyrelsen".

The departments that are inherent to the office are not limited to but are shortly known as:

- The political governance. 
This department has a municipal board that is responsible for the state office's official activities.

- The administrative department.
The administrative department is responsible for office operations, city archives, legal functions, the office of the guardianship board, data protection (GDPR), and information security.

- The analysis and sustainability department. 
The analysis and sustainability department is responsible for sustainability issues, international collaboration, consumer advice, energy, and climate advice, as well as statistics and investigations.

- The state economics department. 
The state economics department is the solely responsible force regarding the official spending of the municipality's funds.

- The finance and company departments. 
The finance and company department is responsible for the municipality's and the municipal companies' financial management and administers "Jönköpings Rådhus AB" and manages the municipality's donation funds.

- The HR department. 
This department is responsible for personnel issues, work environment, negotiations, as well as managerial and personnel development and acts as a development and service body for the municipal administrations.

- The IT - department. 
Responsible for and coordinates the municipality's IT operations and telephony. The department works closely with the municipal administrations and provides the operation and development of systems, services, and products. This is also offered to municipal companies. In case of problems, questions, or need for help, the IT department supports the administrations and the municipal companies.

- The communication department. 
Responsible for the municipality's overall internal and external communication. The municipality's overall communication channels, graphic profile, and press issues are also within the department's area of responsibility. The Communications Department works in close cooperation with the municipal administrations and supports them in their communication work. The department also includes the municipality's Contact Center. The contact center is the public's first contact with the municipality for general questions and information.

- The business department. 
The department works to create conditions for the development and expansion of the existing business community and to stimulate and facilitate new establishments.

- The Procurement Department
Responsible for the municipality's procurement activities and coordination of procurements. The department also conducts procurements in collaboration with Habo and Mullsjö municipalities as well as Rådhus AB and its subsidiaries.

History

Jönköping is an old trading centre (Köping) situated at a natural crossroads for routes following the rivers Nissan and Lagan, and the road connecting the provinces of Östergötland and Västergötland, a result of the town's geographical position at the southern end of lake Vättern, which divides the two provinces.

On 18 May 1284 Jönköping became the first City in Sweden to be granted its rights by king Magnus Ladulås, who ruled mostly from Vättern's largest island Visingsö. The first part of the city's name, "Jön", is derived from a creek, "Junebäcken", in Talavid, in what is now the western part of the city. The second part of the name "köping", is, as mentioned above, an old word for a trading centre or market place.

The geographical position of the city also left it vulnerable to attack via the river routes that led south, mainly from Danes. At that time the provinces of what is today southern Sweden — Scania, Halland and Blekinge — belonged to Denmark. The city was plundered and burned several times until it was fortified during the 16th and 17th centuries.

Jönköping was known for its matchstick industry between 1845 and 1970. The phosphorus match was invented in 1831, and these matches became very popular because one could strike it against any surface to ignite it. However, the problem was that they ignited too easily, caused a lot of accidents and were toxic. In 1844, Swedish professor Gustav Erik Pasch patented a new invention, ”Safety matches - Strike against the box only”. To prevent the matches from igniting so easily, Gustav Erik Pasch separated the chemicals in the match head and placed the phosphorus on a separate surface on the outside of the box for striking ignition. Johan Edvard and Carl Frans Lundström took Pasch's patent and improved it. Later, they manufactured their new Safety matches in their factory in Jönköping. Today it is an important Nordic logistical center, with many companies' central warehouses (such as Elkjøp, IKEA, Electrolux and Husqvarna) situated there.

Present
The urban area of Jönköping today includes the eastern industrial town of Huskvarna, with which it has grown together.

Elmia, a major trade fair and exhibition centre, is situated in Jönköping. Elmia Wood is the world's largest forestry fair, and fairs for subcontractors, trucks, caravans and railways are the biggest of their kind in Europe. Since 2001, Elmia has been the site of the world's largest LAN party, DreamHack, with two events every year, Dreamhack Summer and Dreamhack Winter.

Demography

Population
As of 2018, Jönköping has a total population of 139,222.

Population changes

Average age 2019

Notable people

Johan Björnsson Printz, (1592–1663) governor of the Swedish colony of New Sweden
Carl Peter Thunberg, (1743–1828), botanist
Aurore Storckenfeldt, (1816–1900), educator
Swante M. Swenson,  (1816–1896) founder of the SMS ranches in Texas
Viktor Rydberg (1828-1895), author,
Carl Lotave, (1872–1924) artist, portrait painter
John Bauer, (1882–1918) illustrator, painter
Bernhard Karlgren, (1889–1978) sinologist and linguist
Dag Hammarskjöld, (1905–1961) former United Nations Secretary-General
Martin Allwood, (1916–1999) an educator, writer, sociologist, translator and professor.
Vladimir Oravsky, (born 1947) author
Per G. Malm, (1948–2016) leader in The Church of Jesus Christ of Latter-day Saints
Carl Henrik Fredriksson, (born 1965) editor-in-chief and co-founder of Eurozine
Fredrik Neij, (born 1978) founder of The Pirate Bay BitTorrent-tracker
David F. Sandberg, (born 1981) film director
Mona Johannesson, (born 1987), model

Music 
Agnetha Fältskog, (born 1950) singer/songwriter and member of ABBA
Nina Persson, (born 1974) vocalist with The Cardigans
Amy Diamond,  (born 1992), singer
The Motorhomes, (created in 1997) rock band
The Mary Onettes, (formed in 2000) indie rock band
I'm from Barcelona, (formed in 2005) 29-piece indie pop band

Sport 
Stefan Liv, (1980–2011) an ice hockey goaltender
Göran Kropp, (1966–2002) mountaineer
Anders Gustafsson, (born 1979) kayaker, Olympian
Sofia Paldanius, (born 1979) kayaker, Olympian
Stefan Liv, (1980–2011) an ice hockey goaltender

Education

High schools 
Bäckadalsgymnasiet
Erik Dahlbergsgymnasiet
Per Brahegymnasiet
Sandagymnasiet
Thoren Business School 
LBS: High School of Creativity

Tertiary education 
Jönköping University Foundation
Södra Vätterbygdens Folkhögskola
The Institute for Postgraduate Dental Education

Climate
Jönköping's climate was humid continental (Köppen Dfb) with long, cold winters and short, warm summers during the 1961–1990 period. However, the window between subarctic and oceanic is very small in this marine-influenced climate type, and in recent years the climate has more resembled very cold oceanic. This likely renders up to between half a degree to a full degree milder temperatures in the urban centre.

Sport
 HV71, men's ice hockey team in Hockeyallsvenskan of ice hockey.
 HV71 Dam, women's ice hockey team in the SDHL
 Jönköpings IK (JIK), floorball team who has played several season in the men's Swedish Super League.
 Jönköpings Södra IF, football (soccer) team in Superettan (second-tier league of Sweden).
 Husqvarna FF, football (soccer) team in Division 1 (third tier league of Sweden).
 IK Tord, football (soccer) team in Division 2 Västra Götaland (fourth tier league of Sweden).
 Jönköping Bandy IF, bandy team in Allsvenskan (second-tier league of Sweden).
 Jönköpings SS, swimming society, with Swedish champions in both swimming and diving.  There are also three other water disciplines in the club, lifeguarding and synchronized swimming.
 ATP Challenger Tour event, starting in 2016.
 Jönköping hosted the 1984 World Rowing Junior Championships and the 2019 European Universities Rowing Championships.
 Jönköping hosted the 2011 League of Legends World Championship.

See also
Jönköping Municipality
Swedish National Board of Agriculture
International Ice Hockey Federation World Championships (2002, held in Jönköping)
Tranhult

References

External links

 
 
 article Jönköping from Nordisk familjebok, 

 
Cities in Jönköping County
County seats in Sweden
Populated places in Jönköping Municipality
Municipal seats of Jönköping County
Swedish municipal seats
Market towns in Sweden
Populated lakeshore places in Sweden